Kamil Cholerzyński (born 5 December 1988) is a Polish professional footballer who plays as a defender for the reserve team of GKS Katowice.

He has previously played for GKS Katowice, Rozwój Katowice, and Motor Lublin.

Club career
Cholerzyński began his career at GKS Katowice. On 9 September 2007, he made his professional debut, playing the first half of a 1–3 home loss against Wisła Płock. On 4 November 2009, he scored his first I liga goal against Podbeskidzie Bielsko-Biała, scoring the third goal in the match, which GKS won 3–1. In his eight years in the GKS first team, Cholerzyński made a total of 164 appearances in all competitions, scoring 6 goals.

On 29 June 2015, it was announced that Cholerzyński had signed with I liga side Rozwój Katowice. On 18 July 2015, he made his debut for Rozwój, against Stal Mielec in the Polish Cup. He left the club at the end of the 2015–16 season, having made 21 league appearances.

On 7 February 2017, he signed a contract with Motor Lublin.

International career
Cholerzyński made his first and only appearance for the Poland national under-21 football team on 9 October 2009 in a 2011 UEFA European Under-21 Championship qualification away match to Liechtenstein at Sportpark Eschen-Mauren.

References

External links
 

1988 births
Polish footballers
Poland under-21 international footballers
Association football midfielders
Sportspeople from Katowice
Living people
GKS Katowice players
Rozwój Katowice players
Motor Lublin players
I liga players
III liga players